Pittner is a surname. Notable people with the surname include:

Kurt Pittner (born 1943), Austrian weightlifter
Marek Pittner (born 1997), Slovak footballer
Markus Pittner (born 1967), Austrian wrestler
Olivér Pittner (1911–1971), Hungarian painter

See also
Pitter (disambiguation)